Szkody-Kolonia  is a settlement in the administrative district of Gmina Biała Piska, within Pisz County Warmian-Masurian Voivodeship, in Northern Poland.

References

Szkody-Kolonia